Eucalyptus ceracea also known as the Seppelt Range gum or Seppelt Range yellow-jacket, is a species of small tree or mallee that is endemic to a small area in the north of Western Australia. It has thick, fibrous or flaky bark on the trunk and larger branches, dull, glaucous, egg-shaped leaves arranged in opposite pairs, flower buds in groups of seven or nine, bright orange flowers and urn-shaped fruit. The leaves, buds and fruit are covered with a white wax.

Description
Eucalyptus ceracea is a small tree, often with many stems, or a mallee. The trunk and most of the branches are covered with thick, fibrous or flaky yellowish to reddish brown bark. The leaves are dull and glaucous and there are no adult leaves. Flowering has been recorded in June and the flowers are bright orange. The leaves, buds and fruits of the tree are covered with a white wax.

Taxonomy and naming
Eucalyptus ceracea was first formally described in 1986 by Ian Brooker and Christopher Done from a specimen found south of the King George Falls in the Kimberley region. The description was published in the journal Nuytsia. The specific epithet (ceracea ) is derived from the Latin word cereus meaning "wax" or "waxy", referring to the waxy covering of the plant.

Distribution and habitat
The Seppelt Range gum is found in skeletal sandy soils on scree slopes and sandstone ridges in a small area near the coast in the east Kimberley region of Western Australia. Associated species include spinifex (Plectrachne) and trees including Eucalyptus tectifica, E. tetrodonta and Erythrophleum chlorostachys. It is only known from two populations
found in the Seppelt Range, north of Wyndham. Both populations are located on land vested in the Aboriginal Land Trust.

Conservation status
This eucalypt is listed as "vulnerable" under the Australian Government Environment Protection and Biodiversity Conservation Act 1999 and as "Threatened Flora (Declared Rare Flora — Extant)" by the Department of Environment and Conservation (Western Australia). The main threats to the species are mining, inappropriate fire regimes and its limited distribution.

See also
List of Eucalyptus species

References

External links
 Image of leaves and flowers: 

Eucalypts of Western Australia
Trees of Australia
ceracea
Myrtales of Australia
Plants described in 1986
Taxa named by Ian Brooker